Nicholas Monroe and Michael Yani were the defending champions, but they chose to not participate together this year.
Monroe partnered up with Brian Battistone and they were eliminated by Carsten Ball and Travis Rettenmaier in the semifinal.
Yani played with Todd Widom. They withdrew before match against Pierre-Ludovic Duclos and Alex Kuznetsov in the quarterfinal, due to Widom's injury.
Ball and Rettenmaier became the new winners, after won in the final, against Adam Feeney and Nathan Healey 6–3, 6–4.

Seeds

Draw

Draw

References
 Doubles Draw
 Qualifying Draw

Sunset Moulding YCRC Challenger - Doubles